John Terence Shone   was the Dean of the United Diocese of St Andrews, Dunkeld and Dunblane from 1982 to 1989.

He was born on 15 May 1935 and educated at St Dunstan's College and Selwyn College, Cambridge. Ordained in 1961, he was  Curate at St Pancras Parish Church and then Chaplain of St Andrew's Cathedral, Aberdeen. After three years as a Lecturer at Aberdeen College of Education he held Incumbencies in  Grimsby, Bridge of Allan, Alloa and Dollar

References

1935 births
People educated at St Dunstan's College
Alumni of Selwyn College, Cambridge
Deans of St Andrews, Dunkeld and Dunblane
Living people